Eanmund or Eanumund is an Anglo-Saxon name, and may refer to:
 Eanmund, a prince in the legend of Beawolf
 Eanumund (abbot of Bredon) (fl. 845), abbot of Bredon, in the Kingdom of Mercia
 Eanumund (abbot of Crayke), abbot of Crayke
 Eanumund (abbot of Kent) (fl. 823)
 Eanumund (of Wiltshire), of Wiltshire, in the Kingdom of Wessex
 Eanumund I (fl. 825)
 Saint Eanmund (lived during the Dark Ages)